A Leaf is a classical piece written by Paul McCartney, with assistance from John Fraser, and performed by Anya Alexeyev on piano. The piece is split into 7 parts. It was recorded live in front of Prince Charles as part of the "An Evening with Paul McCartney & Friends" concert, on 23 March 1995 at Royal College of Music, and it was debuted on US radio as part of a radio special titled Classical McCartney.

An orchestral version, performed by the London Symphony Orchestra, appears on McCartney's 1999 album Working Classical. Another orchestral version was recorded on 23 July 1996, at AIR Studios, in London, but remains unreleased.

Track listing
"Andante Semplice" – 1:12
"Poco Piu Mosso" – 1:19
"Allegro Ritmico" – 1:51
"Andante" – 2:04
"Allegro Ma Non Tanto" – 1:15
"Moderato" – 1:18
"Andante Semplice (II)" – 0:54

References

1995 compositions
Compositions for symphony orchestra
Songs written by Paul McCartney
Song recordings produced by Paul McCartney
Music published by MPL Music Publishing